James Foster Wilkin (February 26, 1853 – December 4, 1914) was a lawyer in the U.S. State of Ohio who was an Ohio Supreme Court Judge from 1912 to his death.

Biography
J. Foster Wilkin was born in 1853 at Hollidays Cove, Virginia (now West Virginia). His parents moved to Newcomerstown, Ohio, where he attended the local schools. He studied at Washington & Jefferson College and the College of Wooster. At Washington & Jefferson he was a member of the Beta Theta Pi.  He studied law at the University of Virginia, and had a thirty five year practice at New Philadelphia, Ohio. He married Virginia Smith of Newcomerstown, Ohio, who died in 1919. Wilkin was associated with two of his sons in private practice, David R. and Robert Nugen Wilkin, under the name Wilkin and Wilkin. He was elected Tuscarawas County Prosecuting Attorney in 1882, 1884 and 1886.

An election was held autumn 1912 to fill the unexpired term of James Latimer Price to the Ohio Supreme Court, and Wilkin assumed his seat upon election December 20, 1912. He ran for re-election in 1914, but lost. He died before he could complete his term. He died December 4, 1914 at New Philadelphia, where he had gone to "recuperate from a slight indisposition" His funeral was at the Presbyterian Church in New Philadelphia and burial was at the Canal Dover Cemetery.

He had eight or ten children. His son, Robert Nugen Wilkin, would later be chosen for the Supreme Court.

See also
List of justices of the Ohio Supreme Court

References

Ohio lawyers
Justices of the Ohio Supreme Court
People from New Philadelphia, Ohio
1853 births
1914 deaths
People from Weirton, West Virginia
Beta Theta Pi
Washington & Jefferson College alumni
University of Virginia School of Law alumni
College of Wooster alumni
Ohio Democrats
County district attorneys in Ohio
19th-century American judges
19th-century American lawyers